The first season of Million Star (Chinese: 星光大道) is a Taiwanese reality talent show that is aired on Chinese Television System (CTS). The first episode was filmed on 2 July, and aired on 15 August 2015. This is Taiwan's first reality series to be aired across the globe (Taiwan, Hong Kong, China, Malaysia and Singapore). Viewers can use the Million Star mobile app to interact with the contestants and submit their predictions. The show premiered on 15 August 2015 on Taiwan's CTS, STAR Chinese Channel, Star Entertainment Channel, Fox Taiwan, Coture, Yahoo! Taiwan, Malaysia's Astro Xi Yue HD and Singapore's StarHub E City.

The show sponsor is Gamania.

Judges and hosts
The show's hosts are Sean Lin, winner of the first season of Mimic King, and Patty Wu. Judges forming the judging panel include Matilda Tao, Xiaoyu Sung, Winnie Hsin, William So, Richie Jen, Steve Wong and Edmond Leung; while guest judges include Samingad, Kenji Wu, Chief Chao, Alan Tam, Jam Hsiao, Pauline Lan and Grasshoppers.

Contestants
 Colour key

Blind auditions
The contestants will perform from behind a screen in the beginning. The screen will be lifted when one of the five judges has cast his or her vote, and the contestant is safe if he or she gets three or more votes. On the other hand, the contestant is immediately eliminated if the screen is not lifted. At the end of each episode, the judges will pick five contestants to advance into the top 24. In the end of week 4, the judges will choose four more contestants who were previously eliminated in the blind auditions to save into the top 24.

 Colour key

Episode 1 (15 August)

Episode 2 (22 August)

Episode 3 (29 August)

Episode 4 (5 September)

Top 24
In each episode, each of the six contestants to perform in the episode will select another contestant to battle against each other. In the event that there the contestant has no contenders, the contender will be selected randomly. After both contestants have performed their songs, the judges will decide who will be advanced based on the number of votes for the contestant (Team Red or Team Blue). After each episode, they will decide three eliminated contestants that will be saved among the six.

Top 18 – Cooperative Competition
The 18 contestants will be selected by the producers to be grouped into 9 pairs. After the contestants' performance, the judges will cast their votes. Both contestants will be advanced if they get three or more votes. At the end of the episode, the judges will select two potential contestants to be saved among the six eliminated.

Top 14 – Oldies
The 14 contestants will select the oldie they want to perform. The song selected has to be the song that was performed around their birth. After each contestant's performance, the judges will cast their votes. The contestant will be advanced if he or she get three or more votes. At the end of the episode, the judges will select three potential contestants to be saved among the six eliminated.

The special guest for this episode is Khalil Fong.

Top 10 (Part 1)
The 10 contestants will choose their song to contest. After each contestant's performance, the judges will cast their votes. These votes will be carried over to the following week, where two contestants with the lowest number of votes at the end of two weeks will be eliminated. Grasshoppers occupy two tables and hence are entitled to two votes.

Top 10 (Part 2)

Elimination chart

References

Taiwanese reality television series
2015 television seasons
2015 Taiwanese television series debuts